Bartholomäus van der Lake (died 1468) was a German clergyman and author of a chronicle of the city of Soest.

References

1468 deaths
German chroniclers
Year of birth unknown
15th-century German historians
People from Soest, Germany